Carolina Core FC is an American professional soccer team that is located in High Point, North Carolina. It is an independent team and will participate in MLS Next Pro in 2024.

History 
On November 10, 2022, MLS Next Pro announced that a new independent club will join the league in 2024. The club will be led by Eddie Pope as its Chief Sporting Director and owned by Megan Oglesby, Matt Penley and Mark Penley. They will play at Truist Point Stadium following planned renovations which will increase capacity to 5,000.

Players and staff

Current roster

Staff 
 Eddie Pope - Chief Sporting Officer

See also 
 MLS Next Pro

References

External links 
 Official website

Association football clubs established in 2022
2022 establishments in North Carolina
Soccer clubs in North Carolina
MLS Next Pro teams